Straight River may refer to:

Straight River (central Minnesota), a tributary of the Fish Hook River
Straight River (southern Minnesota), a tributary of the Cannon River
Straight River (Wisconsin), a tributary of the Apple River
Straight River Township, Minnesota